= MiCK assay =

Clinical pathology test

Micro-Culture Kinetic (MiCK) assay, developed by DiaTech Oncology, is a clinical pathology test that measures apoptosis induced in specific patient's cancer cells via chemotherapy. The assay is performed by DiaTech Oncology in its CLAI-certified, CAP-accredited laboratory. The MiCK assay provides oncologists with a clinically relevant drug-sensitivity profile of tumor cells within an individual cancer patient.

For a proper MiCK assay to be performed, the oncologist will send a sample of the specimen (the type of the specimen depends on the type of the cancer) to DiaTech Oncology which will isolate and purify the tumor cells. It is a non-invasive test performed on a small portion of fresh live tumor from tissue, fluids, blood or a sample of bone marrow during the original surgery, indicating that no additional invasive procedure is required.

Once the sample specimen has been received, the tumor cells of an individual patient will be exposed, in vitro, to therapeutic doses of chemotherapy drugs. Once the MiCK assay has been performed, it suggests which chemotherapeutic agent(s) is required to kill the individual patient's specific cancer cells revealed by the developed profile. The MiCK assay results help oncologists choose a chemotherapeutic agent that is most efficient in killing the patient's specific cancer cells.
